Norwegian County Road 419 (Fv419) is a Norwegian county road which runs between the villages of Hannåsmoen and Klepp in Evje og Hornnes municipality in Agder county, Norway. It is one of five bridges over the river Otra in the municipality. The western end of the road connects with the Norwegian National Road 9 which runs north–south into the Setesdalen valley.

References

Evje og Hornnes
419
Road transport in Agder